Buada may refer to:
Buada District, Nauru
Buada Constituency, Nauru
Buada Lagoon, Nauru
 (born 1977), French rugby union player and coach